Peter Silver (born New Haven, Connecticut) is an early American historian.

Life
He was raised in Richmond, Indiana. 
He graduated from Harvard College, magna cum laude, and from Yale University, with an MA and Ph.D. in 2001. 
He taught at Princeton University, where he held the Richard Allen Lester University Preceptorship.
He teaches at Rutgers University.

He lives with his wife and daughter, spending holidays near Southwest Harbor, Maine.

Awards
 1998-1999 Whiting Fellowship
 2001 John Addison Porter Prize
 2008 Bancroft Prize, Our Savage Neighbors
 2008 Mark Lynton History Prize, Our Savage Neighbors

Works
 
 A Rotten Colossus: Spanish and British America in the War of Jenkins's Ear.

References

External links
"Author's website"
"The Older South?", Reviews in American History, Volume 31, Number 2, June 2003
"Book Reviews: Our Savage Neighbors", Pennsylvania Magazine of History and Biography, July 2008

21st-century American historians
21st-century American male writers
Harvard College alumni
Yale University alumni
Princeton University faculty
Rutgers University faculty
Living people
People from Mount Desert Island
Writers from Richmond, Indiana
Year of birth missing (living people)
Bancroft Prize winners
American male non-fiction writers